Carmen Proctor Hill (October 1, 1895 – January 1, 1990), born in Royalton, Minnesota, was a pitcher for the Pittsburgh Pirates (1915–16, 1918–19 and 1926–29), New York Giants (1922) and St. Louis Cardinals (1929–30).

He helped the Giants win the 1922 World Series, the Pirates win the 1927 National League Pennant and the Cardinals win the 1930 NL Pennant.

Hill finished 23rd in voting for the 1927 National League MVP for having a 22–11 win–loss record, 43 Games, 31 games started, 22 complete games, 2 shutouts, 7 games finished, 3 saves,  innings pitched, 260 hits allowed, 100 earned runs, 80 walks, 95 strikeouts, and a 3.24 ERA.

In 10 seasons he had a 49–33 win–loss record, 147 games, 85 games started, 47 complete games, 5 shutouts, 34 games finished, 8 saves, 787 innings pitched, 769 hits allowed, 301 earned runs allowed, 38 home runs allowed, 267 walks, 264 strikeouts, and a 3.44 ERA. In addition, Hill won 202 minor league games over 14 seasons with 7 teams.

Hill was a screwball pitcher.

Hill died in Indianapolis, Indiana at the age of 94.

Sources

References

External links

 

1895 births
1990 deaths
Pittsburgh Pirates players
New York Giants (NL) players
St. Louis Cardinals players
Baseball players from Minnesota
Major League Baseball pitchers
Youngstown Steelmen players
Rochester Hustlers players
Birmingham Barons players
Kansas City Blues (baseball) players
Indianapolis Indians players
Minneapolis Millers (baseball) players
Rochester Red Wings players
Columbus Red Birds players
Screwball pitchers
People from Royalton, Minnesota
Warren Bingoes players